Peta Murray is an Australian writer, born in Sydney in 1958. Best known as a playwright, she also writes short stories and essays and is a freelance dramaturg, director and occasional performer. She leads a parallel life as a teacher of creative writing and late-blooming academic researcher, in the higher education sector.

Early life 
Peta graduated from Killara High School, Sydney in 1975. In 1979 she graduated from the University of New South Wales NSW with a Bachelor of Arts, and Honours in Drama, and went on to complete her Diploma of Education at the University of Sydney in 1980. She then began work as a high-school teacher of English and History, but remained involved in fringe and community theatre throughout her teaching career. In 1989 she began writing full-time. Several of her plays were subsequently published by Currency Press. Her short stories have been published by Sleepers, and Scribe.

Playwright

Murray's first play The Procrastinator was produced by the Griffin Theatre Company in 1981.  Her best-known play, Wallflowering, was workshopped at the Australian National Playwrights' Conference in 1988, and went on to have numerous productions in Australia and overseas. Other works include Salt, Spitting Chips, an adaptation of Tim Winton’s novella Blueback, The Procedure,  and The Keys to the Animal Room produced by Junction Theatre Company in South Australia.

Community theatre works include This Dying Business produced by Junction Theatre Company and The Law of Large Numbers by Mainstreet Theatre company in Mount Gambier. In 2006, she wrote Room, for Playworks and the Melbourne Writers Festival. In 2010 two ‘micro-plays’ featured in Finucane & Smith’s The Carnival of Mysteries at the Melbourne International Arts Festival. She has since developed and produced an epic new work for performance entitled Things That Fall Over: an (anti-)musical of a novel inside a reading of a play, with footnotes, and oratorio-as-coda. This was presented as a marathon of an extravaganza over five hours at Footscray Community Arts Centre on 1 March 2014 to mark International Women's Day. It featured a women's community choir working alongside well known artists and performers including Caroline Lee, Margaret Dobson, Liz Welch, Lisa Maza, and, as Verity in the musical coda, Swansong!!! The Musical!!! the legendary Margret RoadKnight. Music was composed by Peta Williams, choreography was by Robin Laurie and musical direction was by Jo Trevathan.

In 2016 Murray made first forays into live art performance and installation-based work. She presented Litanies for the Forgetful as part of the embOLDen exhibition at Footscray Community Arts Centre, and returned the following year to perform Missa Pro Venerabilibus: A Mass for the Ageing, alongside Robin Laurie and Heather Horrocks. This project was staged as part of Melbourne Fringe Festival, and made in collaboration with scenographers Rachel Burke and Jane Murphy, with whom Murray continues to work.

In 2018 she presented vigil/wake at Arts House, North Melbourne, under the banner of the Mere Mortals season. This work, first staged as part of the Melbourne International Festival project, Survival Skills for Desperate Times, continues to evolve. A  tourable pop-up version was presented at the Public Health Palliative Care International Conference, in Leura, NSW.

2019 also saw Murray return to playwriting, with the premiere season of an immersive and participatory work for children, On Our Beach, created for and staged in Fremantle, Western Australia, by Spare Parts Puppet Theatre. It was directed by Philip Mitchell, designed by Cecile Williams, and featured original music by Lee Buddle.

Other activities 

Peta Murray taught writing at the University of Western Australia Extension Service in the late 1980s, and spent eight weeks as Writer in the Community at Araluen Centre for Arts and Entertainment in Alice Springs in 1991. She has workers as a freelance dramaturg and director, taught playwriting at the University of Melbourne, and for RMIT University, at Melbourne's CAE, and as co-facilitator of The Blak Writers Lab for Ilbijerri Theatre.

In 2010 Murray co-founded, with clinical psychologist Kerrie Noonan, the not-for-profit arts-and-health organisation The GroundSwell Project. Its focus was on challenging Australia's culture of medicalised, institutionalised death and dying, and promoting a public health approach to deliver increased agency and broader choices at end-of-life. Murray served this organisation for many years in a pro bono capacity as its Creative Director before both she and Noonan stepped away in 2019. In the early years of the organisation Murray and Noonan ran three successful iterations of The Drama Project with students and Drama Teacher Nicole Bonfield at Penrith Selective High School. In its first year its intergenerational arts-and-health project: Rain-dancing For Beginners, conducted in partnership with MND NSW won a 2010 Excellence in the Arts in Palliative Care award at the Art of Good Health and Wellbeing, Second International Arts and Health Conference, in Melbourne. The Drama Project was later the subject of a documentary by filmmaker Jordan Byron. In its early years The Groundswell Project also delivered the FilmLife in partnership with the Organ and Tissue Authority, Busting Cancer - a body casting project in Western Sydney for women, and events within the Hidden program at Sydney's Rookwood Cemetery. Murray also devised and ran  workshops on Writing Loss, while Noonan's focus included research projects such as the development of the first national Australia-wide Death Literacy Index, and community programs including Ten Things To Know Before You Go. They later established an annual event, Dying to Know Day, since held in August each year.

Since 2010 Murray has also completed a Diploma of Creative Industries at Victoria University, and two postgraduate degrees,  a Master of Arts in playwriting through QUT, and a creative practice-based PhD through RMIT University. Her doctoral project Essayesque Dismemoir: w/rites of elder-flowering employed variations of the ‘performance essay’ to devise participatory nonfiction on the embodied experience of ageing. As part of her project, awarded in 2017, she produced a triptych of new works, under the title Ware With A Translucent Body.

Since 2018 Murray has held an appointment as a Vice-Chancellor's Postdoctoral Research Fellow in the School of Media & Communication at RMIT, where she is an active member of the non/fictionLab, and one third of the research collective, The Symphony of Awkward, with Dr Stayci Taylor and Dr Kim Munro. The Symphony of Awkward  conduct practice-led research in an emergent-field they call diarology. Peta's own research also concerns the use of transdisciplinary and arts-based practices as modes of inquiry and forms of cultural activism. Her current focus, within the emergent field of arts-and-health, is the use playful and material thinking to develop coherent narrative spaces to promote meaning-making, in the face of illness, grief and loss.

Awards 
Her play Salt won the 2001 Louis Esson Prize for Drama in the Victorian Premier's Literary Awards.

Murray has won Australian Writers' Guild awards for Spitting Chips (Theatre in Education/Community Theatre Category, 1990), The Keys to the Animal Room, (Theatre in Education/Community Theatre Category and Major Award Winner, 1994) and Blueback (Theatre for Young People, 2000).

In 2003, Murray was awarded an Australian Government Centenary Medal for Services to Society and Literature.

References

External links 
 Peta Murray at AustralianPlays.org
 Peta Murray at OzScript
 Peta Murray at Doollee.com
 Review of 2004 production of Wallflowering
 Review of a production of Salt
 Peta Murray - List of AWGIE Winners, 1968-2006

20th-century Australian dramatists and playwrights
Australian women dramatists and playwrights
Living people
Dramaturges
Australian women short story writers
University of Sydney alumni
21st-century Australian dramatists and playwrights
21st-century Australian women writers
20th-century Australian women writers
Year of birth missing (living people)